Tomie Kawakami, better known mononymously as Tomie, is a character from the Japanese horror manga and film series of the same name created by Junji Ito. Tomie was introduced in Ito's 1987 manga Tomie, which was published in Monthly Halloween, a shōjo magazine. She later appeared in two subsequent manga written by Ito, nine feature films, and a novel.

Tomie is a malevolent, regenerative entity with the unexplained ability to cause anyone, particularly men, to be instantly attracted to her. These actions inevitably lead to violence, usually resulting in the murder of Tomie herself (allowing her to replicate herself), or others. Rather than being one singular person or entity, it would be better to describe Tomie as a type of creature, seeing as each copy of Tomie is its own independent individual.

History
Tomie was written and illustrated by Junji Ito. Ito was inspired to create Tomie by the phenomenon of lizard tail regeneration. Ito's initial concept for the manga was to depict the strangeness of a girl who was nonchalantly attending school, but in reality was dead. He further explained that the original concept was that for some reason a dead person would come back to life and visit their former friends as if nothing had happened. As he developed the story, Ito established that the titular character would be a mean-spirited girl because he believed it would be more interesting if the manga featured someone that wasn't likable.

He noted that the proliferation of Tomie was created while writing a serial storyline, which helped greatly to convey the concept of regeneration.

In 1998, during the casting process of the first film adaptation, Ito picked actress Miho Kanno for the role and coached her for the audition.

Characteristics and abilities
Tomie's main characteristic is her exceptional beauty; she is often described as being skinny with slight curves, with pale white skin so shiny and light it is almost transparent, shiny, long black hair (although some manga stories depict her as having blonde, dirty brown, or light brown hair; her hair, typically long and with bangs has also appeared in various other styles) and a beauty mark just beneath her left eye. Her eyes are often shown as being light silver, but some versions show her with brown eyes, particularly the films, the first of which showed a Tomie early in development as having golden-orange eyes that later change to brown. This beauty causes people around her to be jealous of her, or infatuated, to the point where they are driven insane and will do nearly anything for her, and they typically end up cutting her into pieces as a result of an urge her presence caused in people.

Other than her beauty, her main ability is a form of regeneration similar to that of a sea star or a planarian; she heals incredibly fast, even from supposedly mortal wounds, and occasionally if the wound is big enough a new variation of her will grow from her wounds; if a part of her body, such as an arm, leg or even head is severed, an entire clone of her body will grow from the severed part. This will occur even with smaller parts, such as fingers, or even blood. Thus, when her stricken admirers cut her to pieces, Tomie inevitably comes back, often using this opportunity to wreak havoc in their lives after they believe her to be dead.

The one exception to her regenerative powers seems to be Tomie's hair, which, rather than developing into a complete duplicate, will instead attach itself to the body of another person and slowly burrow into their body and multiply, eventually killing the victim by piercing a vital organ or literally causing them to explode with cloned Tomie-hair, as seen in the chapter Hair from the second volume.

In some works, it is implied that burning the body of a Tomie clone will kill her permanently, while in others, she regenerates from the ashes, though this could be because she was not completely burned. Sometimes, when a partially regenerated Tomie spends a long period of time without food, she will resort to cannibalism in one case, dozens of small fragments of Tomie's flesh fell into a pond below a waterfall, and formed sessile bodies, using their powers to lure men into pond, then devoured them alive, continuing this behavior until they were fully formed, at which point they nonchalantly walked out of the pond.

Tomie can also clone herself by having her cells come into contact with a victim, in one case from the skin cells when the victim used her lipstick. These cells will slowly transform the victim into a clone of Tomie, though in some cases, usually when an organ of Tomie's ends up in someone else's body, a new Tomie will grow inside them from the organ and burst out from their body, similar to a Xenomorph from the Alien films.

Tomie is fully aware of her immortality, and generally uses it, along with her powers of seduction, to manipulate her victims seemingly for her own amusement. She does not actually care about any of the people she targets, being stated in the manga as viewing them as "accessories", and despite her vain attitude towards other people her powers cause them to overlook her attitude, though they usually end up having a breaking point in which they end up killing her after she makes fun of them too much.

At times, due to the abundance of times Tomie has died again and again, two Tomie clones will come into conflict with each other, resulting in one attempting to kill the other, and often succeeding only in creating yet more clones of herself, while other times they burn the body and possibly succeed in eliminating their counterpart. This was the basis for the 2007 film Tomie vs Tomie. However, if a group of Tomies are together while in the early stages of development, they will be civil to each other and act similar, even, to squabbling sisters, until they develop fully and begin to act more territorial.

References

Tomie
Comics characters introduced in 1987
Female horror film villains
Horror television characters
Female literary villains
Fictional characters who can duplicate themselves
Fictional succubi
Fictional characters with immortality
Anime and manga characters with accelerated healing
Fictional Japanese people in anime and manga
Female characters in anime and manga